Robert Andre Glasper (born April 6, 1978) is an American pianist, record producer, songwriter, and musical arranger. His artistry bridges several different musical and artistic genres, mostly centered on jazz. To date, Glasper has won five Grammy Awards and received eleven nominations across eight categories.

Glasper's breakout album Black Radio (2012), peaked at number 15 on the Billboard 200 chart, becoming his highest charting album and won the Grammy for best R&B album. The following year, he released the album Black Radio 2. Following this, he worked with Kendrick Lamar, playing the keyboard on Lamar's album To Pimp a Butterfly (2015). He would also appear on the soundtrack for the 2015 drama film Miles Ahead.

Outside of his own musical work, he has co-written and produced on albums by Mac Miller, Anderson .Paak, Banks, Herbie Hancock, Big K.R.I.T., Brittany Howard, Bilal, Denzel Curry, Q-Tip and Talib Kweli amongst others. He won the 2017 Primetime Emmy Award for Outstanding Original Music and Lyrics for his song "A Letter to the Free" featured in Ava DuVernay’s critically hailed documentary, 13th, with Common and Karriem Riggins. Glasper also composed the score for the documentary film The Apollo, and composed the original score for Issa Rae’s The Photograph.

He has also been an Artist in Residence at some of the most prestigious festivals and institutions worldwide, including the London Jazz Festival, North Sea Jazz Festival, The Kennedy Center, Hollywood Bowl, Carnegie Hall and the Blue Note Jazz Club.

Life and career

Early life
Glasper's earliest musical influence was his mother, Kim Yvette Glasper, who sang jazz and blues professionally. She took him with her to club dates rather than leave her son with babysitters. She was the music director at the East Wind Baptist Church, where Glasper first performed in public. He performed during services at three churches: Baptist, Catholic and Seventh-day Adventist. Glasper has said that he first developed his sound in church, where he learned his own way to hear harmony and was inspired to mix church and gospel harmonies with jazz harmonies.

Glasper attended Elkins High School in Missouri City, Texas, and the High School for the Performing and Visual Arts. In tenth grade he performed with the jazz band at Texas Southern University. He was in the second Vail Jazz Workshop in 1997, and went on to attend the New School for Jazz and Contemporary Music in New York City. At the New School, Glasper met neo-soul singer Bilal. They began performing and recording together, which led to associations with a variety of hip hop and R&B artists parallel to Glasper's emerging jazz career.

Hip Hop Love Affair and Influence
Robert Glasper straddles two distinct worlds. He's an accomplished jazz pianist who was signed to Blue Note Records in his mid-twenties. And he works with many hip-hop and R&B artists, both in the studio and on the stage: Q-Tip (musician), Mos Def, and Maxwell, to name a few. Glasper cites Tribe Called Quest as his gateway to hip-hop.

Career
Glasper's playing career was launched in earnest whilst still studying at The New School in New York when he started touring as a sideman with some of the established greats of the scene (bassist Christian McBride, and trumpeters Terence Blanchard and Roy Hargrove). At the same time, Robert was forging a friendship with his New School-mate Bilal, as well as a musical bond that saw them embedded in a burgeoning hip hop and neo soul movement alongside era-defining artists such as Jill Scott, The Roots and J Dilla—during which time Glasper became music director for Yasiin Bey (formerly Mos Def).

Glasper released his first album, Mood, in 2002 with Fresh Sound New Talent. Mood features six original compositions alongside versions of the jazz standards including Herbie Hancock's "Maiden Voyage". Primarily a piano trio recording, with Bob Hurst on bass and Damion Reid on drums, the album also features saxophonists Marcus Strickland and John Ellis, along with the vocalist Bilal.

Around this time, Glasper recorded with Bilal at Electric Lady Studios for the singer's unreleased but widely leaked second album, Love for Sale.

In 2005 Glasper released his debut on Blue Note Records, Canvas, with what was to become his quintessential piano trio lineup of Vicente Archer on bass and Damion Reid on drums. The album features nine original compositions alongside a cover of Herbie Hancock's "Riot".

His third album, In My Element, was released in 2007 and includes songs written in honor of Glasper's mother ("Tribute") and hip hop producer J Dilla ("J Dillalude"). The pianist also revisits Hancock's "Maiden Voyage" in what was becoming his signature fusion style, moving between contemporary and classic as it segues into a version of Radiohead's "Everything in Its Right Place", and quoting Duke Ellington's "Fleurette Africaine".

Glasper's 2009 album, Double-Booked, is divided between songs performed by Glasper in an acoustic piano trio format, and his groundbreaking electric group, The Experiment, with Derrick Hodge, Casey Benjamin and Chris "Daddy" Dave. The album features guest vocals and spoken-word appearances by Bilal and Yasiin Bey (formerly Mos Def). The track "All Matter", which featured Bilal, received a 2010 Grammy Award nomination for Best Urban/Alternative Performance.

In February 2012, Glasper released his fifth and seminal album Black Radio, which featured performances by a lineup of neo-soul and hip-hop artists including Lupe Fiasco, Bilal, Lalah Hathaway, Erykah Badu and Yasiin Bey. Black Radio was met with both commercial success (a #10 debut on Billboards Top Current Albums chart) and critical acclaim, with Rolling Stone declaring that it "feels like a blueprint forward", and went on to win the 2013 Grammy for best R&B album. In 2012 a concert at the Village Vanguard was recorded on video and published on YouTube. In November 2012, Black Radio Recovered: The Remix EP was released with five remixed tracks from the prior album, including remixes by Questlove, Solange, Georgia Muldrow, Pete Rock and 9th Wonder.

In October 2013, Glasper released Black Radio 2. The core remained the Robert Glasper Experiment, featuring Robert Glasper on keyboards, Derrick Hodge on bass, Mark Colenburg on drums, and Casey Benjamin on vocoder and saxophone. Guest vocalists included Common, Brandy, Jill Scott, Marsha Ambrosius, Anthony Hamilton, Faith Evans, Norah Jones, Snoop Dogg, Lupe Fiasco and Emeli Sandé. Notably, Lalah Hathaway and Malcolm-Jamal Warner were featured on a cover of Stevie Wonder's "Jesus Children of America", a dedication to the victims of the Sandy Hook Elementary School shootings. The track would go on to win the Grammy for Best Traditional R&B Performance in 2015, whilst the album was nominated for Best R&B album.

On June 16, 2015, Robert Glasper released Covered, a return to his acoustic piano trio format alongside musicians Damion Reid and Vicente Archer. The album features cover songs, drawn from an eclectic variety of artists, including Radiohead, John Legend, Kendrick Lamar, and Joni Mitchell. The album was recorded live at Capitol Studios in 2014. Covered was nominated for the Grammy Award for Best Jazz Instrumental Album.

2015 saw Glasper and Lauryn Hill co-produce Nina Revisited... A Tribute to Nina Simone, an all-star tribute album pegged to the release of Liz Garbus's documentary What Happened, Miss Simone? The album features artists bringing a contemporary reimagining of Nina Simone's catalogue including contributions from Usher, Common and Mary J. Blige.

In 2015, Glasper served as producer, composer, and arranger for the film Miles Ahead, a biopic documenting the life of jazz trumpeter Miles Davis, whom Glasper cites as being one of his major musical influences. The soundtrack primarily consists of arrangements and interpretations of some of Davis' most well-known compositions, with the exception of a few tunes written by Glasper himself, and won him the 2017 Grammy for Best Compilation Soundtrack for Visual Media.

In 2016, Glasper was able to pay further tribute to Miles Davis, releasing Everything's Beautiful on May 27, 2016, his first with Columbia Records and Legacy Recordings. The album serves as a tribute to Davis by way of remixes and reinterpretations of several of his original works. The album debuted in the top 10 billboard Hip Hop and R&B charts, the highest Miles Davis charted according to Rolling Stone. Although Davis died in 1991, he is credited as a co-artist of the album. The album includes features from Stevie Wonder, Bilal, Illa J, Erykah Badu, Phonte, Hiatus Kaiyote, Laura Mvula, Georgia Anne Muldrow, Ledisi, and John Scofield.

September 16, 2016 marked Glasper's return to his electric group, the Robert Glasper Experiment, with the release of ArtScience: the first Experiment LP where all members write and produce, and the first with no guest vocalists, although Glasper himself sings on the album. It features saxophonist and vocalist Casey Benjamin, bassist Derrick Hodge and drummer Mark Colenburg alongside Glasper, and was recorded in New Orleans. Glasper would go on to release a remix version of the album in collaboration with Kaytranada in 2018 entitled Robert Glasper x Kaytranada: The ArtScience Remixes.

2016 saw Glasper receive attention for his prominent role on Kendrick Lamar's critically acclaimed album To Pimp a Butterfly, notably playing on the Grammy-winning track "These Walls".

In October 2016, Glasper co-hosted the inaugural Blue Note Cruise alongside Gregory Porter. The cruise became an annual event and Robert co-hosts it each year with bassist Marcus Miller.

In January 2017, Glasper performed with Christina Aguilera at Taking the Stage, the celebratory concert commemorating the opening of the Smithsonian's new National Museum of African American History and Culture in Washington, D.C. It was hosted by Dave Chappelle and featured a plethora of other icons of black music and culture including Stevie Wonder, Mary J. Blige, Chuck D and others. The concert was made into a feature-length program and broadcast on ABC in June 2020.

In February 2017, Glasper partnered with Afropunk as Creative and Musical Director for their special Unapologetically Black show, performed at the Apollo Theater. A celebration of African American protest music, the show featured Jill Scott, Bilal, Staceyann Chin and Toshi Reagon alongside a special big band ensemble led by Glasper.

On September 29, 2017 Glasper released Our Point of View with the Blue Note All Stars band, for which he brought together other leading figures of his generation for a special project celebrating the legacy and future of Blue Note Records. The record featured each artist's original compositions as well as a jam session, recorded live in the studio, where the band were joined by Glasper's heroes and jazz icons Herbie Hancock and Wayne Shorter. Don Was co-produced the album with Glasper and footage of the recording session features on Sophi Huber's 2019 documentary, Blue Note Records: Behind the Notes.

In September 2017, Glasper appeared on a live stream with Esperanza Spalding while recording "Heaven in Pennies" for Spalding's album Exposure, which was released in December 2017.

In 2018 Glasper formed two new supergroups: R+R=Now with Terrace Martin, Derrick Hodge, Taylor McFerrin, Christian Scott and Justin Tyson; and August Greene with Common and Karriem Riggins accompanied by Burniss Travis and Samora Pinderhughes.

R+R=Now stands for Reflect+Respond=Now, a nod to Nina Simone's statement that "An artist's duty, as far as I'm concerned, is to reflect the times" and a reference to the current political climate. R+R=Now's debut album, Collagically Speaking, was released on June 15, 2018.

August Greene was formed by Glasper, Common and Riggins after Glasper and Riggins jointly produced Common's Black America album, which included the Emmy-winning track "Letter to the Free", which featured on Ava DuVernay's documentary 13th. The group had previously performed together for a special edition of the Tiny Desk Concerts concert series at the White House in 2016, the only one done in the location. August Greene released their self-titled debut album on February 21, 2018.

In October 2018 Glasper launched the first of what would become his annual month-long residencies at the Blue Note Jazz Club.

Each year, in the course of playing 56 sold-out shows across 30 days, Glasper curates a unique program—testimony to the breadth of his portfolio, vision and bandmates—and draws the great and the good of his creative community to the shows on and off stage. Projects have included a tribute to Stevie Wonder with Luke James, a band with Yasiin Bey (formerly Mos Def) and a trio with Esperanza Spalding. Guests have ranged from Common, Black Thought, Yebba and Q-Tip to Angela Davis and Ilyasah Shabazz, Dave Chappelle and Tiffany Haddish, many of whom have made unscripted appearances performing with Glasper as well as watching the show.

In the summer of 2019 Glasper was Artist in Residence at the North Sea Jazz Festival, curating and performing over the weekend with a series of special bands and projects across the festival's stages.

In September 2019 Glasper was Artist in Residence at the John F. Kennedy Center for the Performing Arts. He commemorated the opening of their new building with a two-week series of events and outreach.

On October 3, 2019 Glasper released the mixtape Fuck Yo Feelings, his first recording with Loma Vista Recordings, on the first day of his 56-show 2019 residency at the Blue Note Jazz Club. Fuck Yo Feelings is the result of a two-day session in which Glasper texted invitations to his musician friends to stop by the studio and organically create together. Featured artists, who included Herbie Hancock, Cordae, Buddy, Andra Day, Yebba, Baby Rose and Rhapsody, often composed their contributions on the spot. The album's name mirrors a tattoo that Glasper got a week before recording.

In 2019 Robert Glasper appeared in Toni Thai Sterrett's "Potty Break" web series as an R&B artist named "The Hawk".

Glasper closed out 2019 by composing the original music for the documentary The Apollo, which tells the story of the Harlem venue of the same name. Glasper co-wrote and performed the film's end credit song "Don't Turn Back Now" alongside Ledisi.

In 2020 Glasper continued his work on the big screen by writing the score for the film The Photograph. Released on February 14, 2020, the film was directed by Stella Meghie and stars Issa Rae and Lakeith Stanfield.

On June 25, 2020, Robert Glasper, Kamasi Washington, Terrace Martin, and 9th Wonder announced the formation of a supergroup, Dinner Party. They released a single, "Freeze Tag", followed by their self-titled debut album July 10, 2020.

In March 2020 March Glasper performed at the March On Washington with Derrick Hodge and George Clinton.

On August 27 of 2020, Robert released "Better Than I Imagined", the first single from his forthcoming Black Radio 3 album. It features H.E.R. and Meshell Ndegeocello.

In August 2020, Glasper contributed to the live streamed recording of the singer Bilal's EP Voyage-19, created remotely during the COVID-19 pandemic lockdowns. It was released the following month with proceeds from its sales going to participating musicians in financial hardship from the pandemic.

In September 2020 Glasper collaborated with Common to write and perform the ending theme song for the educational Netflix show Bookmarks, in which Black celebrities and artists read children's books by Black authors to spark meaningful conversations about empathy, equality, justice, self-love, and anti-racism. Presented by Marley Dias, the show features readings by Lupita Nyong'o, Jill Scott, Misty Copeland, Karamo Brown and more.

In 2018, Glasper appeared on The Potash Twins series 'Beats + Bites' (Bravo TV) along with Wynton Marsalis, Smino & Tom Colicchio.

On January 14, 2022, Glasper announced on his Instagram page that on February 25 he would be releasing the third installment in his Black Radio series, entitled Black Radio III.

Musical style
Glasper's albums are centered on his work as a solo artist, and two bands: The Robert Glasper Trio (on piano Robert Glasper, drummer Damion Reid, and bassist Vicente Archer) as an acoustic jazz trio, and The Robert Glasper Experiment (Glasper, drummer Mark Colenburg, saxophonist/vocoderist Casey Benjamin and  bassist Derrick Hodge) as an electronic act that defies genre norms from any single discipline. "That's what makes this band unique... We can go anywhere, literally anywhere, we want to go. We all have musical ADD and we love it." With primary influences in neo-soul, hip-hop, jazz, gospel, and R&B, Glasper also has reinterpreted songs from rock acts Nirvana, Radiohead, Soundgarden, and David Bowie. As a jazz artist, Rashod D. Ollison reviewed him after the release of Canvas as "a gifted jazz musician with a brilliant, energetic technique and a fresh, mesmerizing sense of melody and composition".

Glasper claims that the music of Miles Davis has had a significant influence on his style throughout his career as a musician. Both the soundtrack for Miles Ahead and the tribute album Everything's Beautiful are clear indications of this influence.

"I'm obviously influenced by Miles Davis – even just the psyche of how he thinks about music...how he moves through, and always wanted to reflect the times he's in. That's what I'm doing now. He opened that door."

Awards and nominations
Grammy Awards

|-
|2010
|"All Matter" (with Bilal)
|Best Urban/Alternative Performance
|
|-
|rowspan="2"|2013
|Black Radio
|Best R&B Album
|
|-
|"Gonna Be Alright (F.T.B.)" (with Ledisi)
|Best R&B Performance
|
|-
|rowspan="2"|2015
|Black Radio 2
|Best R&B Album
|
|-
|"Jesus Children of America" (with Lalah Hathaway & Malcolm-Jamal Warner)
|Best Traditional R&B Performance
|
|-
|2016
|Covered: Recorded Live at Capitol Records
|Best Jazz Instrumental Album
|
|-
|2017
|Miles Ahead
|Best Compilation Soundtrack for Visual Media
|
|-
|rowspan="2"|2021
|Fuck Yo Feelings
|Best Progressive R&B Album
|
|-
|"Better Than I Imagined" (with H.E.R. & Meshell Ndegeocello)
|Best R&B Song
|
|-
|rowspan="2"|2023
|Black Radio III
|Best R&B Album
|
|-
|Black Radio III
|Best Engineered Album, Non-Classical
|
|-
|}

Discography

Studio albums

EPs
Black Radio Recovered: The Remix EP (Blue Note, 2012)
Porter Chops Glasper (Blue Note, February 25, 2014)
Dinner Party with Terrace Martin, Kamasi Washington and 9th Wonder (Sounds of Crenshaw/Empire, July 10, 2020)

Soundtracks
Miles Ahead: Original Motion Picture Soundtrack (Columbia/Legacy, 2015)
The Photograph: Original Motion Picture Soundtrack (Back Lot Music, 2020)

With R+R=Now 
 Collagically speaking (Blue Note, 2018)

References

External links

  – official site
 
 
 
 
 Robert Glasper performs at NPR Music
 "Progressing Under the Radar with Precision and Daring", New York Times, 2004
 "Robert Glasper: The pianist whose jazz is filled with soul", The Telegraph, 2007
 In Conversation with Robert Glasper, Jazz.com, 2009
 Charlie Parker Jazz Festival: Cool Jazz in Harlem, New York The New York Sun
 Robert Glasper, Jazz Times

1978 births
Living people
American jazz pianists
American male pianists
Musicians from Houston
Songwriters from Texas
Grammy Award winners
African-American pianists
High School for the Performing and Visual Arts alumni
Jazz musicians from Texas
21st-century American pianists
21st-century American male musicians
American male jazz musicians
August Greene members
African-American songwriters
21st-century African-American musicians
20th-century African-American people
American male songwriters
Nu jazz musicians
Loma Vista Recordings artists